V. G. Arun is a judge of the Kerala High Court. The  High Court of Kerala  is the highest court in the Indian state of Kerala and in the Union Territory of Lakshadweep. The High Court of Kerala is headquartered at Ernakulam, Kochi.

Early life and education
Arun  was born on 25.01.1964. After completing his graduation in Economics from Baselius College, Kottayam, he obtained a law degree from Kerala Law Academy, Thiruvananthapuram.

Career
Arun was enrolled as Advocate on 08.01.1989 and started his practice in various courts at Calicut and later shifted his practice to High Court of Kerala, Ernakulam in December, 1990 with Senior Advocate TR Raman Pillai. In 2005 he was appointed as the Editor of Indian Law Reports Kerala Series and he served with post till 04.11.2018. On 05.11.2018 he was elevated as Additional Judge of High Court of Kerala.

References

Living people
Judges of the Kerala High Court
21st-century Indian judges
1964 births